The Battle of Trembowla, more popularly known as the Defence of Trembowla took place between September 20 – October 11, 1675, during the Polish-Ottoman War (1672-1676). Heroic resistance of Polish forces became a symbol, and was glorified and immortalised in the paintings of Franciszek Smuglewicz, Józef Peszka and Aleksander Lesser.

History 
The castle in Trembowla was built in the 14th century on a high hill over the valley of the Hniezna river. Despite its small size (100 metres by 40 metres), it was a strong fortress with walls up to 4 metres thick. After the Turks had captured Kamieniec Podolski (see Siege of Kamieniec Podolski), Trembowla was one of the few Podolian strongholds still in Polish hands.

In the summer of 1675, a 30,000 strong Turkish-Tatar army under command of Ibrahim Shyshman entered Red Ruthenia, a province of the Polish–Lithuanian Commonwealth. On July 27, the invaders captured Zbaraz, on September 11, Podhajce, and on September 20, the Turks approached Trembowla. The castle was defended by a small unit of 80 infantry soldiers, some members of the local nobility, supported by 200 poorly armed, untrained peasants and residents of the town, who fled to the castle. Before the siege, a unit of dragoons stationed here, but was ordered to leave Trembowla, due to food shortages. Polish forces were commanded by Captain Jan Samuel Chrzanowski, whose wife, Anna Dorota Chrzanowska (née Anna Dorota von Fresen), became immortalized after the siege.

Despite Ottoman efforts, the defenders of castle managed to hold their positions after several attacks. After several days, however, shortages of food and water became severe, and Captain Chrzanowski decided to surrender. His wife disagreed with this decision, and threatened to commit suicide if her husband proceeded with the planned surrender, thereby stiffening his spine and creating an atmosphere for defending the castle. Furthermore, Anna Dorota urged the defenders to carry out an attack on Turkish positions, which resulted in heavy losses among the invaders. Chrzanowska's determination raised the morale among the Poles, but their losses were also heavy. In the night of October 4/5, only 20 soldiers were able to fight. Facing danger from forces of Jan III Sobieski, which concentrated near Lwow, the Turks decided to end the siege on October 11.

Aftermath 
In 1676 Polish Sejm allowed the Chrzanowski couple to become the szlachta, with the right to use the Poraj coat of arms. They became celebrities, famous all over the Commonwealth and abroad. In 1683 Chrzanowski was named stolnik of Smolensk and Mielnik, and a monument of Anna Dorota Chrzanowska was erected in Trembowla in 1683.

Siege of Trembowla in Culture 
The siege of Trembowla and story of Anna Chrzanowska inspired Polish painters and writers alike.
Most notable works:
 Aleksander Lesser (1814–1884)  painting  Defense of the Trembowla against the Turks 
 Leopold Löffler  (1827–1898),  painting  Anna Dorota Chrzanowska at the castle in Trembowla 
 Józef Wybicki (1747–1822), drama
 Zofia Kossak-Szczucka (1889–1968), novel   Trembowla  
 Maria Krüger (1904–1999), story  Marcynka's bright braid  in the collection  Golden Crown  
 Andrzej Waligórski (1926–1992), poem  Song about the defense of Trembowla  which was performed by Tadeusz Chyłę (1933–2014).

See also 
Battle of Lwów (1675)

References

Sources 

  Mala Encyklopedia Wojskowa, Wydawnictwo Ministerstwa Obrony Narodowej, Warszawa 1967, Wydanie I, Tom 2
  Bohaterska obrona Trembowli w 1675 r. 

1675 in Europe
Trembowla
Trembowla
Trembowla
1670s in the Ottoman Empire
Terebovlia
Trembowla